Werlin is a surname. Notable people with the name include:

Jakob Werlin (1886–1965),  Austrian auto salesman
Johann Werlin (died ca. 1680), German Baroque composer
Nancy Werlin (born 1961), American writer of young-adult novels
Wenceslaus Werlin (died 1780), Austrian painter

See also
Welin